Forenza is a town and comune in the province of Potenza,  Basilicata, southern Italy. It is bounded by the comuni of Acerenza, Avigliano, Filiano, Ginestra, Maschito, Palazzo San Gervasio, Pietragalla, Ripacandida.

American World War I veteran Antonio Pierro was born in Forenza in 1896.
  
The village of Forenza is built on a hill top near the ruins of the ancient Samnite city of Forentum, which was occupied by the ancient Romans in 317 BC and destroyed during the Gothic War of 535–553 AD.

Main sights
Sights include:
Chiesa del Crocifisso, which preserves a wooden crucifix from the 17th century
Chiesa Madre (Mother Church), featuring a  Romanesque portal 
Annunziata Church, housing a statue of S. Maria of the Lombards in the interior.

References

External links

Cities and towns in Basilicata